WeCrashed is an American drama streaming television miniseries that premiered on Apple TV+ on March 18, 2022. The series stars Jared Leto and Anne Hathaway as Adam and Rebekah Neumann, the real-life married couple at the heart of WeWork, a coworking space company whose valuation reached $47 billion in 2019 before crashing as a result of financial revelations. The series is based on the podcast WeCrashed: The Rise and Fall of WeWork by Wondery.

Cast and characters

Main
 Jared Leto as Adam Neumann, co-founder of WeWork
 Anne Hathaway as Rebekah Neumann, Adam's wife

Recurring
 Kyle Marvin as Miguel McKelvey, co-founder of WeWork
 Kelly AuCoin as Scott Galloway
 Steven Boyer as Matthew
 Cricket Brown as Chloe Morgan
 Andrew Burnap as Phil  
 Anthony Edwards as Bruce Dunlevie
 O. T. Fagbenle as Cameron Lautner
 America Ferrera as Elishia Kennedy
 Asmeret Ghebremichael as Renee 
 Peter Jacobson as Bob Paltrow
 Kim Eui-sung as Masayoshi Son
 Campbell Scott as Jamie Dimon
 Theo Stockman as Jacob

Development
WeCrashed: The Rise and Fall of WeWork, a  six-part podcast, is the basis for the series. WeCrashed: The Director’s Cut podcast is a remake of the podcast, with David Brown by Wondery.

Production
After Lee Eisenberg signed a multi-year overall deal with Apple, it was reported that a drama series based on the story of WeWork was in development in February 2020. It was announced in December 2020 that Apple TV+ had put the series into development, with Jared Leto in negotiations to star. Damien Chazelle was initially supposed to direct and produce, but was sidetracked by his film Babylon and dropped out. He was replaced by John Requa and Glenn Ficarra. Lee Eisenberg and Drew Crevello were set to create and write the series. The series was given an eight-episode series order the next month, with Leto confirmed to star alongside Anne Hathaway; both will serve as executive producers. In April 2021, Kyle Marvin was cast in a lead role, portraying Miguel McKelvey, another co-founder of WeWork. In July 2021, America Ferrera was added to the cast. In August 2021, O. T. Fagbenle was added to the cast in recurring capacity. In December 2021, Theo Stockman was added to the cast in recurring role, with Anthony Edwards noted as being cast in February 2022.

Filming
In May 2021, Hathaway was spotted filming for the series in New York City.

Episodes

Release
A portion of the series previewed at South by Southwest on March 12, 2022.

The series premiered on Apple TV+ on March 18, 2022.

Reception
On review aggregator website Rotten Tomatoes, the series holds a 70% approval rating based on 20 critic reviews, with an average rating of 6.8/10. The website's critics consensus reads, "The pacing can be frustrating, but WeCrashed still works thanks to its compelling central relationship and Anne Hathaway's knockout performance." On Metacritic, the series has a score of 64 out of 100, based on 10 critic reviews, indicating "generally favorable reviews".

Naomi Fry in The New Yorker called the show "genuinely funny", but complained that the business scenes, which become more frequent toward the end of the show, lack dramatic stakes. She did praise Leto's performance, saying "I don’t think I've ever seen a better impression of an Israeli's accent and mannerisms done by a non-Israeli". A number of reviewers criticized the series for not exploring the deeper issues raised by the WeWork story, such as "how thin the line in Silicon Valley can be between visionary and fraudster", or how Neumann's success came in part because he managed "to tap into a specifically millennial sense of longing for meaning and community".

Historical accuracy
WeCrashed contains a mix of real and fictional characters and events, although the fictional elements tend to have a basis in reality. For example, the character Elishia Kennedy is fictional but largely based on SoulCycle co-founder Julie Rice. The episode "Summer Camp" involves Rebekah Neumann making an onstage comment at a 2014 "Summer Camp" event that antagonizes many of the female employees, leading to a session in which they vent their frustrations at her. In reality, she did make the comment, but at a 2018 Summer Camp, and there was no corresponding discussion session afterwards, although many of the sentiments expressed had been stated publicly or privately by female employees at various times.

Bloomberg News reporter Ellen Huet felt the show was inaccurate in portraying WeWork co-founder Miguel McKelvey as "a clueless punchline", when in reality "many former employees saw him as a key architect of the company culture".

Further reading

Further viewing
 WeWork: Or the Making and Breaking of a $47 Billion Unicorn

References

External links

2020s American workplace drama television series
2020s American drama television miniseries
2022 American television series debuts
2022 American television series endings
Apple TV+ original programming
Television shows based on podcasts
WeWork
English-language television shows